Yonki Dam is an earth-fill embankment dam over the Ramu River that supports the Ramu 1 hydroelectric power plant and the (under construction) Yonki Toe of Dam power plant.

Yonki Dam is located in the Eastern Highlands Province of Papua New Guinea.

The Highlands Highway passes over the Yonki Dam embankment. The adjacent Yonki villages support the operation of the dam and power station.

Ramu 1 
Ramu 1 Power Station is a  hydroelectric power station located on the Ramu in Eastern Highlands Province, Papua New Guinea.

The power station consists of five units. The power station is owned and operated by PNG Power.

References

Dams completed in 1991
Eastern Highlands Province
Dams in Papua New Guinea
Earth-filled dams
1991 establishments in Papua New Guinea